J.-Eugène Bissonnette (March 4, 1892 – September 13, 1980) was a Quebec-born politician and physician. He was born in Ste. Claire, Quebec, Canada. He was elected to the House of Commons of Canada as a Member of the Progressive Conservative Party in 1958 to represent the riding of Quebec West. He was defeated in the 1962 election.

External links
 

1892 births
1980 deaths
Members of the House of Commons of Canada from Quebec
Progressive Conservative Party of Canada MPs